1882 was the 96th season of cricket in England since the foundation of Marylebone Cricket Club (MCC). England lost to Australia in the match which gave rise to the Ashes.

Champion County

 Lancashire, Nottinghamshire (shared)

Playing record (by county)

Leading batsmen (qualification 20 innings)

Leading bowlers (qualification 1,000 balls)

Events
 8 April (approx.):  Formation of Warwickshire County Cricket Club at a meeting in Coventry.
 10 May:  Formation of Durham County Cricket Club.
 Somerset County Cricket Club played its initial first-class match v. Lancashire at Old Trafford on 8, 9 & 10 June and joined the County Championship, but for only four seasons initially.
 14 August: C.T. Studd became the second player after W.G. Grace to accomplish the "double" of 1,000 runs and 100 wickets, which he achieved by dismissing Grace.
 28 & 29 August.  England v. Australia at The Oval (only Test of the season).  Australia won the most famous match in history by 7 runs with F R Spofforth, the original "Demon Bowler", taking seven for 46 and seven for 44.  Soon afterwards, The Sporting Times printed its legendary obituary notice:

In Affectionate Remembrance
of
ENGLISH CRICKET,
which died at the Oval
on
29th AUGUST, 1882,
Deeply lamented by a large circle of sorrowing
friends and acquaintances
----
R.I.P.
----
N.B.—The body will be cremated and the
ashes taken to Australia.
 25 September: Ted Peate breaks the late James Southerton’s 1870 record by taking his 211st wicket of the season. His record stands until Charles Turner takes his 215th wicket on 23 August 1888.

Further details can be found in the articles History of Test cricket (to 1883) and The Ashes.

Notes
An unofficial seasonal title sometimes proclaimed by consensus of media and historians prior to December 1889 when the official County Championship was constituted. Although there are ante-dated claims prior to 1873, when residence qualifications were introduced, it is only since that ruling that any quasi-official status can be ascribed.

References

Annual reviews
 John Lillywhite's Cricketer's Companion (Green Lilly), Lillywhite, 1883
 James Lillywhite's Cricketers’ Annual (Red Lilly), Lillywhite, 1883
John Wisden's Cricketers' Almanack 1883

External links
 CricketArchive – season summaries

1882 in English cricket
English cricket seasons in the 19th century